Percy Thompson Dean, VC (20 July 1877  – 20 March 1939) was a British businessman, politician, sailor, and a recipient of the Victoria Cross, the highest award for gallantry in the face of the enemy that can be awarded to British and Commonwealth forces, and also a politician.

Victoria Cross
Dean was 40 years old and a lieutenant in the Royal Naval Volunteer Reserve during the First World War when the following deed took place for which he was awarded the VC.

On 22 and 23 April 1918 at Zeebrugge, Belgium, after Intrepid and Iphigenia had been scuttled, their crews were taken off by Motor Launch 282 commanded by Lieutenant Dean. He embarked more than 100 officers and men under constant and deadly fire from heavy and machine-guns at point blank range. This complete, he was about to clear the canal when the steering gear broke down, so he manoeuvred on his engines and was actually clear of the entrance to the harbour when he was told there was an officer in the water. He immediately turned back and rescued him.

Dean later achieved the rank of lieutenant commander.

Post-war
After the war, Dean was elected at the 1918 general election as a Conservative Member of Parliament for Blackburn, serving until the 1922 general election. He was chairman of the Moelferna and Dee Side Slate and Slab Quarries Company in Wales between the wars.

Dean's VC is on display in the Lord Ashcroft Gallery at the Imperial War Museum, London.

References

External links
 
 Location of grave and VC medal (Golders Green)
 

1877 births
1939 deaths
People from Blackburn
Conservative Party (UK) MPs for English constituencies
UK MPs 1918–1922
British World War I recipients of the Victoria Cross
Royal Navy recipients of the Victoria Cross
People educated at Bromsgrove School
Royal Navy officers of World War I
Royal Naval Volunteer Reserve personnel of World War I
Politics of Blackburn with Darwen